Vendemianus the Hermit of Bithynia was a solitary monk of the early sixth century.

Vendemianus (Bendemianus) was a disciple of St. Auxentius and became known for his holiness of life and gift of healing.  He dwelt for more than forty years on a mountain cliff near the hermitage of Auxentius in the region of Chalcedon in Asia Minor.

Vendemianus the Hermit of Bithynia is commemorated on the 1st of February in the Eastern Orthodox and Byzantine Catholic Churches.

See also

Christian monasticism
Stylites
Poustinia

References
Orthodox Church in America

Byzantine hermits
6th-century Christian saints
6th-century Byzantine monks
Byzantine Anatolians
Byzantine saints
Saints from Anatolia
People from Bithynia